Tsvetino is a village located in Velingrad Municipality, Pazardzhik Province, Southern Bulgaria.

The village of Tsvetino is located in a mountainous area 25 km southwest of Velingrad. Mainly potatoes are grown, due to harsh climate conditions in the area.

History 
Tsvetino is considered an old village in the Chepino Valley, as it was first originated as a pastoral settlement. The people came to the village from Macedonia after a plague epidemic, which concludes that the people speak a Macedonian dialect. Until 1979 the village was the centre of a municipality with 35 scattered neighborhoods and huts, and then it became a village with an mayor, even though its under the 350 people requirement.

The old name is Florovo, deriving from the French word fleur, which means flower.

References 

Villages in Pazardzhik Province